Ganga Bahadur Thapa (1935 – 25 January 2011) was a Nepalese long-distance runner. He competed in the marathon at the 1964 Summer Olympics.

References

External links
 

1935 births
2011 deaths
People from Kathmandu District
Athletes (track and field) at the 1964 Summer Olympics
Nepalese male long-distance runners
Nepalese male marathon runners
Olympic athletes of Nepal
20th-century Nepalese people